Mucilaginibacter mallensis is a chemoorganotrophic, aerobic and non-motile bacterium from the genus of Mucilaginibacter which has been isolated from the Finnish Lapland.

References

External links
Type strain of Mucilaginibacter mallensis at BacDive -  the Bacterial Diversity Metadatabase

Sphingobacteriia
Bacteria described in 2010